Tsukamurella hominis is a Gram-positive, non-spore-forming and non-motile bacterium from the genus of Tsukamurella which has been isolated from a conjunctival swab.

References 

Mycobacteriales
Bacteria described in 2018